Caduceus was a New Zealand bred Standardbred racehorse. Caduceus is notable for winning the 1960 Inter Dominion Trotting Championship, trotting's premiership event in Australia and New Zealand, from a handicap of 36 yards, in front of a world record crowd. Prior to this in New Zealand, he had won major events including the New Zealand Free For All sprint race on three occasions plus the Auckland Pacing Cup.

In 1960, he went to the United States, the first to prove he could match the very top US horses. He ended up winning more than £100,000, with gallopers Tulloch and Sailor's Guide as the only horses bred in Australia or New Zealand to have achieved this distinction at that time.

He was an inaugural inductee into the New Zealand Trotting Hall of Fame with the immortals Cardigan Bay, Harold Logan, Highland Fling, Johnny Globe and Ordeal.

1960 Inter Dominion

The most notable race took place on 13 February 1960 at Harold Park Paceway, Sydney, when the "mighty atom" Caduceus from New Zealand defeated Australia's Apmat in the final of the Inter Dominion before a world record crowd of 50,346. Caduceus and Apmat had been singled out as the best two chances in a star-studded final field, and throughout the heat series, it could be seen that the rivalry which existed between these two great horses had been carried on to their drivers Jack Litten of New Zealand on Caduceus, and the local champion, Bert Alley on Apmat.

People crammed every vantage point to watch the race. They were jammed on every square inch of the inside greyhound circuit and packed into what is now the centre-course carpark. Those who were unable to see in the grandstand tore down timber and three ply partitions in the main grandstand. At finish, Caduceus passed the post half a length clear of Apmat, with the Victorian Maestro's Melody a neck away third and Fettle a close fourth. Caduceus received one of the most deafening ovations ever heard on a racetrack, but whilst the cheers were still sounding, the news was announced that a protest was lodged by Bert Alley against Caduceus being declared the winner. This produced a most unfavourable reaction from the crowd, strange in the circumstances for they had turned against their own local horse. The Stewards, however, dismissed the protest and Caduceus was the winner of one of the most exciting sporting events ever held in Sydney.

United States
In 1960, aged nine, Caduceus went to the United States to compete in the annual Yonkers Raceway International Series. Caduceus showed he was just as good as the top American horses, even winning the last race of the series, only to be disqualified. He was then leased to American interests, and at 10 years was still winning races. He won 82 races before he was returned to New Zealand and sired 18 winners before his early death after only two seasons at stud.

Major races
 1960 Inter Dominion Pacing Championship
 1959 New Zealand Free For All
 1958 New Zealand Free For All
 1956 New Zealand Free For All
 1954 Auckland Pacing Cup

See also

 Harness racing in New Zealand
 Harness racing in Australia
 Harness racing

References

Auckland Pacing Cup winners
Inter Dominion winners
New Zealand standardbred racehorses
New Zealand Trotting Hall of Fame horses
Harness racing in the United States
Harness racing in Canada
1950 racehorse births
Inter Dominion Trotting winners